German submarine U-650 was a Type VIIC U-boat of Nazi Germany's Kriegsmarine during World War II. The submarine was laid down on 9 January 1942 at the Blohm & Voss yard at Hamburg, launched on 1 October 1942, and commissioned on 26 November 1942 under the command of Oberleutnant zur See Ernst von Witzendorff.

Attached to 5th U-boat Flotilla based at Kiel, U-650 completed her training period on 30 April 1943 and was assigned to front-line service.

Design
German Type VIIC submarines were preceded by the shorter Type VIIB submarines. U-650 had a displacement of  when at the surface and  while submerged. She had two shafts and two  propellers.

U-650 was fitted with five  torpedo tubes (four fitted at the bow and one at the stern), fourteen torpedoes, one  SK C/35 naval gun, 220 rounds, and one twin  C/30 anti-aircraft gun. The boat had a complement of between forty-four and sixty.

Service history
While on patrol in the North Atlantic, U-650 was detected by Allied vessels and sunk by hedgehog off the coast of Cornwall on 7 January 1945.

References

Bibliography

External links

German Type VIIC submarines
1942 ships
Ships built in Hamburg
U-boats commissioned in 1942
U-boats sunk in 1944
World War II shipwrecks in the Atlantic Ocean
World War II submarines of Germany
Maritime incidents in January 1945